Morgan Yasbincek (born 1964) is a contemporary Australian poet, novelist and academic.

Morgan Yasbincek lives in Western Australia where she completed her PhD at Murdoch University. She has held a residency at the University of East Anglia, United Kingdom in 1998 and currently teaches creative writing at Murdoch. Her writing, in both poetry and prose,  deals with everyday concerns refracted through the lens of contemporary literary theory. Her first collection of poems, Night Reversing, won both the Anne Elder and the Mary Gilmore Awards for poetry.

Works
Poetry
Night Reversing. (Fremantle Arts Centre Press, 1996) 
Firelick. (Fremantle Arts Centre, 2004)  
White Camel. (John Leonard Press, 2009) 

Novel
Liv: A novel. (Fremantle Arts Centre, 2000)

References

External links
 Home page
 Working note & poems at However
 Review of Firelick

1964 births
20th-century Australian novelists
Australian poets
Australian women novelists
Australian women poets
Living people
Academic staff of Murdoch University
Murdoch University alumni
20th-century Australian women writers